Margin Call is a 2011 American drama film written and directed by J. C. Chandor in his feature directorial debut. The principal story takes place over a 24-hour period at a large Wall Street investment bank during the initial stages of the financial crisis of 2007–2008. In focus are the actions taken by a group of employees during the subsequent financial collapse. The title comes from a finance term for when an investor must increase the securities or other assets used as collateral for a loan when their value falls below a certain threshold. The film stars an ensemble cast consisting of Kevin Spacey, Paul Bettany, Jeremy Irons, Zachary Quinto, Penn Badgley, Simon Baker, Mary McDonnell, Demi Moore, and Stanley Tucci.

The film was produced by the production companies Myriad Pictures, Benaroya Pictures and Before the Door Pictures (first to sign on, and owned by Zachary Quinto). Theatrically, it was commercially distributed by Lionsgate and Roadside Attractions. The director and screenwriter, J. C. Chandor, is himself the son of an investment banker; the screenplay was partially informed by Chandor's own foray into real estate investments in New York City shortly before the financial crash. Preceding its theatrical release, Margin Call was met with positive critical reviews. Following its wide release in theaters, the film garnered award nominations from the Detroit Film Critics Society, along with several separate nominations for its screenplay and direction from recognized award organizations, including a nomination for the Academy Award for Best Original Screenplay. The score was composed by musician Nathan Larson.

The film made its premiere at the Sundance Film Festival on January 25, 2011, and opened in theaters nationwide in the United States on October 21, 2011. Though it grossed just $5.4 million in domestic ticket sales from 199 theaters, the film had a ground-breaking day-and-date release that earned more than $10 million in video-on-demand sales. The DVD and Blu-ray editions of the film were released in the United States on December 20, 2011.

Plot
In 2008, an unnamed investment bank begins laying off a large number of employees. Among those affected is Eric Dale, head of risk management. Dale's attempts to speak about the implications of a model he is working on are ignored. On his way out, he gives a flash drive containing his work to Peter Sullivan, an associate in his department, warning him to "be careful." Sullivan, intrigued, works after hours to complete Dale's model.

Sullivan discovers that the assumptions underpinning the firm's present risk profile are wrong; historical volatility levels in mortgage-backed securities are being exceeded, which means that the firm's position in those assets is over-leveraged and the debt incurred from those over-leveraged assets will bankrupt the company. Sullivan calls his colleague, Seth Bregman, to return to work with the head of credit trading, Will Emerson. Emerson in turn summons Sam Rogers, his boss, after reviewing Sullivan's findings. Attempts by the four to contact Dale end unsuccessfully due to his company phone having been shut off. Sullivan and Bregman go out to find Dale, while Rogers and Emerson inform the company's senior management of the situation.

A subsequent meeting of division head Jared Cohen, chief risk management officer Sarah Robertson, and other senior executives concludes that Sullivan's findings are accurate, and firm CEO John Tuld is called. Upon Tuld's arrival, and after Sullivan explains the problem, Rogers, Cohen, and Tuld spar regarding a course of action. Cohen's plan, favored by Tuld, is a fire sale of the problematic assets. Rogers disagrees, pointing out that the sale will damage the firm's relationships and reputation within the industry and will cause major instability in the markets. Tuld stresses that his desire to avoid the firm's bankruptcy is worth that risk and the cost.

After the meeting with Tuld, Emerson is informed by Dale's wife that he has returned home. Emerson travels to Dale's residence with Bregman and attempts to persuade him to return to the firm, but is unsuccessful. During the drive back, Bregman asks if he will lose his job; Emerson responds that he likely will, but, philosophizing on the nature of the financial markets, tells him not to lose faith, and that his work is necessary.

Tuld selects Robertson to act as the scapegoat for the firm's over-leveraged position and demands that she resign after the fire sale. Robertson argues that she warned Tuld and Cohen about the situation over a year ago, but fails to persuade him. Meanwhile, Eric Dale is bribed and forced into cooperating with Cohen's plan, with the firm threatening to cut his benefits and severance if he refuses. He spends the day commiserating with Robertson.

Despite his misgivings, Rogers rallies his traders and informs them of the fire sale. He acknowledges the damage likely to be done to their reputations and careers, but informs them that they will be well compensated if most of the traders' assigned assets are sold by day's end. As trading progresses, the firm elicits suspicion and eventually anger from their counterparties, and incurs heavy losses, but they are able to sell off most of the bad assets.

As another round of layoffs occurs, Rogers confronts Tuld and submits his resignation. Tuld dismisses Rogers' view of the situation by recalling past economic crises, arguing that such events always happen and that Rogers should not feel guilty for acting in his and the firm's interests. Tuld asks Rogers to stay on for two more years and Rogers reluctantly accepts, citing his personal financial need. Tuld also informs Rogers that Sullivan is going to be promoted.

The film ends with Rogers burying his euthanized dog in his ex-wife's front yard during the night. She informs him that their son's firm also sustained heavy losses but avoided bankruptcy.

Cast

Production

Filming
Principal photography began on June 21, 2010, in New York City. More than 80% of the action was shot on the 42nd floor of One Penn Plaza, which had recently been vacated by a trading firm.

The film premiered at the 2011 Sundance Film Festival in Park City, Utah. The film also played In Competition at the 61st Berlin International Film Festival and was nominated for the Golden Bear. The film was produced by Zachary Quinto's production company, Before the Door Pictures, by Quinto and his two producing partners and Carnegie Mellon University classmates, Neal Dodson and Corey Moosa.

Reception

Critical response
The film received positive reviews from critics. On Rotten Tomatoes, it has an approval rating of 87% based on 172 reviews, with an average rating of 7.20/10. The website's critical consensus reads: "Smart, tightly wound, and solidly acted, Margin Call turns the convoluted financial meltdown of '08 into gripping, thought-provoking drama." On Metacritic, the film has a weighted average score of 76 out of 100, based on 38 critics, indicating "generally favorable reviews".

The New Yorker film critic David Denby said it was "easily the best Wall Street movie ever made". Roger Ebert of the Chicago Sun-Times gave the film three and half stars out of four, and said: "Margin Call employs an excellent cast who can make financial talk into compelling dialogue." A. O. Scott of The New York Times wrote: "It is hard to believe that Margin Call is Mr. Chandor’s first feature. His formal command—his ability to imply far more than he shows or says and to orchestrate a large, complex drama out of whispers, glances, and snippets of jargon—is downright awe inspiring." In 2022, Bloomberg News financial columnist Matt Levine said that Margin Call was "the best finance movie".

Themes
Roger Ebert wrote: "I think the movie is about how its characters are concerned only by the welfare of their corporations. There is no larger sense of the public good. Corporations are amoral, and exist to survive and succeed, at whatever human cost. This is what the Occupy Wall Street protesters are angry about: They are not against capitalism, but about Wall Street dishonesty and greed. ... [The cast] reflects the enormity of what is happening: Their company and their lives are being rendered meaningless." A. O. Scott wrote: "Margin Call is a thriller, moving through ambient shadows to the anxious tempo of Nathan Larson’s hushed, anxious score. It is also a horror movie, with disaster lurking like an unseen demon outside the skyscraper windows and behind the computer screens. It is also a workplace comedy of sorts. The crackling, syncopated dialogue and the plot, full of reversals and double crosses, owe an obvious debt to David Mamet’s profane fables of deal-making machismo. Hovering over all of it is the dark romance of capital: the elegance of numbers; the kinkiness of money; the deep, rotten, erotic allure of power."

Although the film does not depict any real Wall Street firm, and the fictional firm is never named, the plot has similarities to some events during the 2008 financial crisis: Goldman Sachs similarly moved early to hedge and reduce its position in mortgage-backed securities, at the urging of two employees, which essentially mirrors Tuld's comment about the advantage of moving first. Lehman Brothers moved second and went bankrupt. John Tuld's name is said to be a combination of Merrill Lynch's ex-CEO John Thain and Lehman Brothers' ex-CEO Richard Fuld.

Accolades

See also

 The Big Short (film)
 Inside Job (2010)
 The Hummingbird Project
 Bankruptcy of Lehman Brothers
 Great Recession
 Too Big to Fail (film)
 The Wolf of Wall Street (2013 film)

References
Footnotes

External links

 
 
 
 
 

2011 directorial debut films
2011 drama films
2011 films
2011 independent films
2011 thriller drama films
American independent films
American business films
American thriller drama films
Films about financial crises
Films directed by J. C. Chandor
Films set in 2008
Films set in New York City
Films set in the Great Recession
Films shot in New York City
Financial thrillers
Lionsgate films
Roadside Attractions films
Trading films
Wall Street films
2010s English-language films
2010s American films